Deh Chasht (also Romanized as Deh Chāsht) is a village in Mohammadabad Rural District, in the Central District of Marvdasht County, Fars Province, Iran. At the 2006 census, its population was 184, in 46 families.

References 

Populated places in Marvdasht County